This Man Craig is a TV drama series produced by BBC Scotland and screened over 52 episodes in 1966 and 1967. It was set in a secondary school in the fictional Scottish town of Strathaird. Episodes were filmed at Glasgow’s Bellahouston Academy and Knightswood School. The series dealt with the everyday issues affecting both staff and pupils at Strathaird School, and in particular the title character, idealistic science teacher and housemaster Ian Craig (played by John Cairney).

The first series was shown over 26 episodes between January 7, 1966 and July 1, 1966. The second series was shown over 26 episodes between September 17, 1966 and March 21, 1967. Only two episodes are known to be still in existence in the BBC Archives. The opening sequence showed Ian Craig driving over the Forth Road Bridge, which at the time was newly built and a Scottish cultural icon.

Only two episodes ("Dougie" and "The Time Wasters") are known to exist.

Main cast
John Cairney as Ian Craig
Ellen McIntosh as Margaret Craig
Brian Pettifer as James Craig
Alex McCrindle as Willie Sinclair
Leonard Maguire as Mr Robertson
Joan Alcorn as Katie Duncan

List of episodes
Almost all episodes are missing, except when indicated:

Season One
With Luv from Rosie
Patterson
The Search
A Wise Father
Dougie (exists) 
Girl in a Thousand
Three's Company
Live Like a Man
A Lower Deep
Sticks and Stones
Big Fall
The Bike
Time For Protest
The Key to it All
Tall, Fat and Ugly
A Rough Passage
The Expedition
The Romantic
Certain Standards
Two Thousand a Year
A Question of Biology
Mates
The Rubbing Rag
Whose Pigeon?
The Golden Key to Knowledge
Old Flame

Season Two
The Day Before School
Early Days
The Time Wasters (exists; recovered in 2014)  
Swimmer in a Shallow Cup
The Trolls
Surgery
Period of Adjustment
The Good Chemist
Sons of McCall
Nurinder
What Made Sammy?
'I'
Fresh Off the Boat
The Pirate Cut
Pressures
The Water Baby
The Tinks
Then There Were Nine
There's Got to be a Fire Somewhere
You Can Choose Your Friends
Stevie
The Day's Run
Chris and the Wheelbarrow
Another School of Thought
The Moffatt Foundation
Two by Two

External links
 

1960s British drama television series
1966 Scottish television series debuts
1967 Scottish television series endings
1960s Scottish television series
Lost BBC episodes